The 2021 season is the 110th season of competitive association football in Victoria.

The season was disrupted due to the impacts from the COVID-19 pandemic in Australia, with the season being suspended in August 2021 from government-imposed lockdowns, and cancelled in September. No Premiers were declared, and promotion and relegation was suspended until the following season.

However, as a result of a court challenge involving Avondale FC and Football Victoria, it was agreed that eight rounds of games from the 2022 NPL Season would also count towards the 2021 NPL league table, enabling sufficient matches to be played to "complete" the season, and be able to declare a Premier.

League tables

2021 National Premier Leagues Victoria

In addition to the season being cancelled in September, the 2021 National Premier Leagues finals series was also cancelled (the NPL Premier normally qualifies for the national NPL finals series). With the resumption of games for the 2022 season, a select number of rounds and matches would also count towards the league table for the 2021 season, so that after 26 rounds a Premier could be declared.

Oakleigh Cannons were crowned as Premiers on 26 July 2022.

Initial Table (2021)

Additional Matches (2022)

Final Table (2021 and 2022)

2021 National Premier Leagues Victoria 2

2021 National Premier Leagues Victoria 3

Women's football

2021 National Premier Leagues Victoria Women

Cup Competitions

2021 Dockerty Cup

Football Victoria soccer clubs competed in 2021 for the Dockerty Cup. The tournament doubled as the Victorian qualifiers for the 2021 FFA Cup, with the top four clubs progressing to the Round of 32. A total of 210 clubs entered the qualifying phase, with the clubs entering in a staggered format.

The Cup was won by Avondale FC, their first title.

In addition to the three A-League clubs (Melbourne Victory, Melbourne City and Western United), the four semi-finalists (Avondale FC, Hume City, Port Melbourne and South Melbourne) competed in the final rounds of the 2021 FFA Cup.

References

2021 in Victorian soccer
Soccer in Victoria (Australia)
Association football events curtailed and voided due to the COVID-19 pandemic